Matías Alberto Abisab Gutiérrez (born 10 September 1993), is a footballer of Uruguay who plays as midfielder for Cusco.

References

External links
 

1993 births
Living people
Uruguayan people of Arab descent
Uruguayan footballers
C.A. Bella Vista players
C.A. Cerro players
Deportivo Maldonado players
Sud América players
C.A. Rentistas players
Uruguayan Primera División players
Uruguayan Segunda División players
Association football midfielders